Hot Properties is an American sitcom featuring four women working together in a Manhattan real estate office. It was first aired on October 7, 2005 on ABC. The series finale aired on Friday, December 30, 2005.

Plot
Often compared to Sex and the City and the CBS situation comedy Designing Women, this show features four single women professionals, each with distinct personalities that contribute in their failure to secure dates. The comparison to these shows led many critics to describe the show as unoriginal. The women share a passion for Oprah.

Cast

Characters
Ava is the forty-nine-year-old executive of the Hot Properties real estate firm. Her husband is half her age, but he is not aware of her age. Ava is madly in love with him, and hopes to raise a family.
Chloe is down to earth, sarcastic, and relies on self-help books for personal advice. She is very desperate to get married, but keeps dating the wrong men.
Lola is a curvy Latina who has emerged from a recent divorce, after her husband came out as gay. Throughout the show, men stare at her and compete for Lola's attention, to which she is often oblivious. Lola's desire for handsome men often leads her in pursuit of gay men, resulting in disappointment. As a result, she is often afraid to go dating. Lola hopes to improve her "gaydar" in order to avoid future disappointments.
Emerson is young and rich, with little work experience. She was engaged, but upon discovering that the fiancée was not a virgin, broke it off. She bonds instantly with her roommates.

Episodes

Reception
The show received a largely negative critical reception, with review aggregator Metacritic awarding it 31 out of 100 based on 22 reviews. Tim Goodman of the San Francisco Chronicle called the show "stupid and annoying", along with fellow ABC sitcom ''Freddie.

International broadcasters

References

External links

2000s American romantic comedy television series
2000s American sitcoms
2000s American workplace comedy television series
2005 American television series debuts
2005 American television series endings
American Broadcasting Company original programming
English-language television shows
Television series by Warner Bros. Television Studios
Television shows set in Manhattan